This is a list of router and firewall distributions, which are operating systems designed for use as routers and/or firewalls.

See also
 List of router firmware projects
 Comparison of router software projects

References

Free routing software
 
Router